Andy Young (21 June 1925 – 27 October 2008) was a Scottish footballer who played as a wing half for Celtic and Raith Rovers.

External links
 Obituary at The Scotsman
 

1925 births
2008 deaths
Footballers from Fife
Association football wing halves
Scottish footballers
Scottish Football League players
Celtic F.C. players
Raith Rovers F.C. players